Alien Intruder is a 1993 action/science-fiction film directed by Ricardo Jacques Gale and written by Nick Stone. It stars Maxwell Caulfield, Tracy Scoggins, Billy Dee Williams, Gary Roberts, Richard Cody, and Stephen Davies.

Plot
Set in 2022,  several convicts sentenced to life in prison are led on a mission into uncharted deep space by Commander Skyler (Williams) to salvage a lost ship. Should they survive their mission, their sentence will be commuted. Astronaut Borman had killed the crew of the lost ship.

While on the way to the ship, the convicts are allowed into a series virtual reality world where they could live out their sexual fantasies with any woman they choose.

However, Ariel  (Scoggins), a woman who is not part of the virtual reality programs appears in it, kills each virtual woman, and seduces each convict. When Ariel begins to appear outside the program, she manipulates the men, who quickly turn on each other.

Cast
 Borman (Jeff Conaway)
 Ariel (Tracy Scoggins)
 Commander Skyler (Billy Dee Williams)
 Nick (Maxwell Caulfield)
 D.J. (Richard Cody)
 Peter (Stephen Davies)
 Lloyd (Gary Roberts)

Production
The virtual reality sequences are parodies of Casablanca, Westerns and Motorcycle movies. "Broadway Joe" Murphy provided many of the stunts in the movie. Produced by PM Entertainment

Reception
Creature Feature gave the movie 2 out of 5 stars, finding the effects to undermine the films good intentions. TV Guide found that the movie wasn't as good as the idea, giving the movie one of five stars. Entertainment Weekly gave the movie a D+ finding the movie crude.

Home release
Released on both VHS and DVD.

References

External links

1993 films
1990s science fiction action films
American science fiction action films
American space adventure films
Films set in 2022
1990s English-language films
1990s American films